The Women's Parallel in the 2022 FIS Alpine Skiing World Cup consisted of only 1 event, a parallel giant slalom, due to the continuing COVID-19 pandemic. The sole event was won by Andreja Slokar, who thus won the season championship. Because only one race was run, Slokar will not be awarded a crystal globe for winning this discipline. This specific championship includes both parallel giant slalom and parallel slalom races. At this time, individual parallel races are not included in the season finals.

The season was interrupted by the 2022 Winter Olympics in Beijing, China (at the Yanqing National Alpine Skiing Centre in Yanqing District) from 6–20 February 2022.  The only parallel competition was a mixed team competition (2 men and 2 women per country), which was held on 20 February 2022.

Standings

DNS = Did Not Start
DNQ = Did Not Qualify

See also
 2022 Alpine Skiing World Cup – Women's summary rankings
 2022 Alpine Skiing World Cup – Women's Overall
 2022 Alpine Skiing World Cup – Women's Downhill
 2022 Alpine Skiing World Cup – Women's Super-G
 2022 Alpine Skiing World Cup – Women's Giant Slalom
 2022 Alpine Skiing World Cup – Women's Slalom
 World Cup scoring system

References

External links
 Alpine Skiing at FIS website

Women's parallel
FIS Alpine Ski World Cup women's parallel discipline titles